The 30th Anniversary Concert - Live in Tokyo is a live video album by the Michael Schenker Group, released in 2010.

The recorded live performance was filmed at the Nakano Sun Plaza in Tokyo on 13 January 2010, during the 30th Anniversary Japan Tour. The footage originally aired on 27 March on the Japanese TV channel NHK-BS2. The concert was released in DVD containing 18 tracks, in Blu-ray Disc and as a double CD album, with exactly the same tracks.

Double CD track listing

Disk one

Disc two

DVD
The track listing is the same as the audio album.
Bonus material
The L.A. Rehearsal
Backstage Impressions

Personnel

Band members
 Gary Barden - vocals
 Michael Schenker - lead/rhythm/acoustic guitars, backing vocals
 Wayne Findlay - keyboards, rhythm guitars, backing vocals
 Neil Murray - bass
 Simon Phillips - drums

Production
Kiyoshi Iwasawa - director and producer
Shin Yamamoto - director
Kota Akutsu - producer
Michael Voss - mixing

References

Michael Schenker Group albums
2010 live albums
2010 video albums
Live video albums
Albums recorded at Nakano Sun Plaza